The Flüela Schwarzhorn is a mountain of the Albula Alps, overlooking the Flüela Pass, in the canton of Graubünden. With a height of 3,146 metres above sea level, it is the highest point of the Albula Alps north of the Fuorcla da Grialetsch (2,537 m). From the Flüela Pass a trail leads to the summit.

References

External links
Flüela Schwarzhorn on Hikr

Mountains of the Alps
Alpine three-thousanders
Mountains of Switzerland
Mountains of Graubünden
Davos
Zernez